Jan Isaac Shrem (born 1930) is an American book distributor and publisher, winery owner, art collector and philanthropist.

Early life and education

Born in Colombia to Jewish-Lebanese parents, Shrem spent his childhood in Jerusalem and his early adolescence in Colombia. He immigrated to the United States at age 16. He attended the University of Utah and UCLA. While in college, he sold encyclopedias.

Book distribution and publishing business in Japan

A romance with a Japanese woman led him to visit Japan. He stayed for 13 years, establishing a book distribution company that sold English language encyclopedias, engineering books and art books. His company also published translations of books into Japanese.  Shrem sold his Japanese business after 13 years. At that time,  it had 50 offices and 2,000 salespeople.

He met Mitsuko Shrem in 1960; they married and had two sons, Marc and David. They were married until her death from pancreatic cancer in 2010.

Business ventures in Europe

After selling his Japanese company, Shrem lived with his family in Italy and France, where he continued with publishing and book distribution ventures. There, he began collecting art and learning about wine. He studied enology at the University of Bordeaux.

Clos Pegase Winery

After retiring from the publishing business, Shrem relocated to the Napa Valley,  where he established Clos Pegase Winery in 1983. In cooperation with the San Francisco Museum of Modern Art, he conducted an architectural design competition for a winery building. Out of 96 entries, the winner was Michael Graves, who would design the postmodern Clos Pegase Winery building,  which opened in 1987.

In the Washington Post in 1988, James Conaway said that "Clos Pegase is our first monument to wine as art." It was later described by architecture critic Susan Dinkelspiel Cerny as "an interpretation of Classicism in ochre and burnt sienna, with a spare desert feeling."

Shrem is well known for delivering a humorous lecture on the 4000 year history of wine as seen through art. He calls his presentation "Bacchus the Rascal: A Bacchanalian History of Wine Seen Through 4000 Years of Art".

Shrem married Maria Manetti Farrow in 2012. He sold Clos Pegase to Leslie Rudd's Vintage Wine Estates in 2013, when he was 83 years old.

Philanthropy 

In recent years,  the Shrems have donated $10 million to the University of California, Davis to help build the Manetti Shrem Museum of Art, $3 million to the San Francisco Opera and $1.5 million to KQED in San Francisco. The gift to KQED was the largest individual gift that public radio and TV station had ever received. In 2019, the Shrems donated $18 million to the University of California, San Francisco to build the Jan Shrem and Maria Manetti Shrem Neurology Clinic, a unique clinic specializing in difficult-to-diagnose neurology cases, located within the Weill Institute for Neurosciences.

References

External links
Jan Shrem and Maria Manetti Shrem Museum of Art
Clos Pegase Winery

Philanthropists from California
American winemakers
American book publishers (people)
1930 births
Living people